Otto Rudolf Salvisberg (19 October 1882– 23 December 1940) was a Swiss architect. 

Between 1905 and 1930 Salvisberg worked in Germany. He worked with Bruno Ahrends and Wilhelm Büning to design the "White City" housing settlement in Berlin.

External links

1882 births
1940 deaths
Swiss architects
Academic staff of ETH Zurich